Santa Ana (Entre Ríos) is a village and municipality in Entre Ríos Province in north-eastern Argentina.
Santa Ana is a town located in the Province of Santa Fe, Argentina, in the General Obligado's Department, pertaining to the Municipality of Avellaneda. Is located 15 km at north of the city of Avellaneda and to 340 km to the north of the Capital City of Santa Fe. It limits the North with Flor de Oro, the South with Moussy, the East with El Timbo and the West with La Colmena.
The 1979 completion of the Salto Grande Dam put thousands of acres under water, and Santa Ana shifted to citrus production, which now supports 60% of the population.

References

Populated places in Entre Ríos Province